Glúniarann (literally Iron-Knee) was a Viking leader who may have reigned as King of Dublin. It is speculated he may have been a member of the Uí Ímair.

Biography
The Annals of Ulster mention Glúniarann for the first and only time in 895, describing him plundering Armagh with an army of Dubliners:

The Annals of the Four Masters are the only other annals which mention Glúniarann by name, describing the same event:

Downham speculates that Glúniarann may have succeeded Sitriuc mac Ímair as King of Dublin. Throughout the 880s and 890s Dublin suffered through debilitating dynastic conflicts, resulting in the ambiguity as to who ruled. The annals do not mention Glúniarann's origins, but the name was later used by a member of the Uí Ímair, perhaps indicating a familial connection between Glúniarann and Ímar. Glúniarann's ultimate fate is unknown, but a man named Glúntradna mac Glúniarainn, likely a son, is mentioned by the annals. The Annals of the Four Masters describe Glúntradna 's death:

The Chronicon Scotorum describes the same event, but adds no further information.

References

Citations

Primary Sources

Secondary Sources

External links
 CELT: Corpus of Electronic Texts at University College Cork. The Corpus of Electronic Texts includes the Annals of Ulster and the Four Masters, the Chronicon Scotorum and the Book of Leinster as well as Genealogies, and various Saints' Lives. Most are translated into English, or translations are in progress.

9th-century Irish monarchs
Monarchs of Dublin
Year of birth unknown
Uí Ímair